Ashima Bhalla is an Indian actress who has appeared in Hindi, Telugu, and Tamil language films. She also appeared on television, portraying the lead role in the Indian soap Meri Awaz Ko Mil Gayi Roshni on StarPlus. She also participated in the show Ek Khiladi Ek Haseena alongside Irfan Pathan.

Filmography

Films

Television

See also

 List of Indian film actresses

References

External links
 

Actresses in Hindi cinema
Actresses in Assamese cinema
Living people
Actresses in Telugu cinema
Indian film actresses
Actresses in Tamil cinema
Actresses from Assam
21st-century Indian actresses
Year of birth missing (living people)